Shing Mun Tunnels Bus Interchange is a major bus interchange in Hong Kong.  Most bus routes that span Sha Tin and Tai Wai and Tsuen Wan, Kwai Chung, and Tsing Yi pass through Shing Mun Tunnels and make a stop at the bus interchange.

Bus stations in Hong Kong
Transport interchange in Hong Kong